William Glennie Nixon (November 22, 1881 – February 24, 1966) was a farmer and political figure in Ontario. He represented Timiskaming in the Legislative Assembly of Ontario from 1934 to 1943 as a Liberal member.

He was born in Sault Ste. Marie in 1881, the son of William Charles Nixon and Margaret Jane Stephen, and was educated in Sault Ste. Marie and Guelph. In 1920, Nixon married Ethel Mary Pigott. Nixon later entered the insurance business. He lived in New Liskeard. He died in Ottawa in 1966.

References 

1881 births
Year of death missing
Ontario Liberal Party MPPs
Canadian farmers
People from Sault Ste. Marie, Ontario